The following is a timeline of the history of the city of Tel Aviv, Israel.


19th century 
20th century: 1900s1910s1920s 1930s1940s1950s1960s 1970s1980s 1990s
21st century: 2000s2010s 2020s

19th century

 1886 – Neve-Tzedek was founded.
 1890 – Neve Shalom was founded.
 1896 – Yafa Nof was founded.
 1899 – Achva was founded.

20th century

1900s
 1904 – Ohel Moshe was founded.
 1906 – Kerem HaTeimanim was founded.
 1909 – Tel Aviv founded near Jaffa.

1910s
 1917 – April: Tel Aviv and Jaffa deportation.

1920s
 1921 – Meir Dizengoff becomes mayor.
 1925 – David Bloch-Blumenfeld becomes mayor.

1930s
 1930s – White City built.
 1932
 Tel Aviv Museum of Art established.
 Maccabiah Stadium opens.
 1936 – Israel Rokach becomes mayor.
 1938 – Tel Aviv Zoo opens.
 1939 – Yedioth Ahronoth newspaper begins publication.

1940s
 1941 – Tel Aviv Central Bus Station opens.
 1948 – Population: 244,614.

1950s

 1950
 Tel Aviv-Jaffa municipality formed.
 Chen Cinema opens.
 1951 – Ramat Gan Stadium opens in Tel Aviv metropolitan.
 1953
 Tel Aviv Stock Exchange founded.
 Chaim Levanon becomes mayor.

1960s
 1960
 Mordechai Namir becomes mayor.
 Israel Sports Center for the Disabled established near city.
 1962 – Bloomfield Stadium opens.
 1963 – Yad Eliyahu Arena opens.
 1964 – November: 16th Chess Olympiad held.
 1965 – Shalom Meir Tower built.
 1968 – November: 1968 Summer Paralympics.
 1969 – Yehoshua Rabinovitz becomes mayor.

1970s
 1970
 Luna Park (amusement park) built.
  Russian-language newspaper in publication.
 1972 – London Ministores Mall built.
 1973 – Yarkon Park and Tel Aviv Cinematheque open.
 1974 – Shlomo Lahat becomes mayor.

1980s
 1983 – Dizengoff Center (shopping mall) in business.
 1987 – Marganit Tower built.
 1989 – Suzanne Dellal Center for Dance and Theater established.

1990s
 1990 – Tel Aviv 2000 Terminal (bus station) built.
 1993
 Roni Milo becomes mayor.
 Opera Tower built.
 1994 – 19 October: Dizengoff Street bus bombing.
 1995 – 4 November: Assassination of Yitzhak Rabin.
 1996 – 4 March: Dizengoff Center suicide bombing.
 1997 – Isrotel Tower built.
 1998
 Ron Huldai becomes mayor.
 Center for Contemporary Art founded.
 1999 – Azrieli Center, Tzameret Towers, and Beit Rubinstein hi-rise built.

2000s
 2000
 Tel Aviv University Railway Station opens.
 Levinstein Tower and Tel Aviv Towers built.

21st century
 2003 – Matcal Tower and Tel Aviv Convention Center pavilion built.
 2005 – Kirya Tower built.
 2006
 Bank Discount Tower built.
 Tel Aviv LGBT Film Festival begins.
 2007 – Neve Tzedek Tower built.
 2009
 Tel Aviv-Yafo Centennial.
 First International Bank Tower and Vision Tower built.
 Tel Aviv gay centre shooting

2010s
 2011
 Elco Tower built.
 Tel Aviv Light Rail construction begins.
 2013 – Population: 414,600.

2020s

See also
 History of Tel Aviv
 Timeline of Jaffa
 Timeline of Jerusalem
 Timeline of Haifa
 Timeline of Israeli history
 List of cities in Israel

References

This article incorporates information from the Hebrew Wikipedia, Polish Wikipedia, and French Wikipedia.

Bibliography

External links

 Map of Tel Aviv, 1958
 Europeana. Items related to Tel Aviv, various dates.

 
Tel Aviv
Tel Aviv-related lists
tel aviv
Years in Israel